Lesnoy is a rural locality (a settlement) in Borovikhinsky Selsoviet, Pervomaysky District, Altai Krai, Russia. The population was 35 as of 2013.

Geography 
Lesnoy is located 16 km from Novoaltaysk, 20 km from Barnaul.

References 

Rural localities in Pervomaysky District, Altai Krai